Reginald Cheyne Berkeley  (18 August 1890 – 30 March 1935) was a Liberal Party politician in the United Kingdom, and later a writer of stage plays, then a screenwriter in Hollywood. He had trained as a lawyer. He died in Los Angeles from pneumonia after an operation.

His son Humphry Berkeley was a Conservative MP in the United Kingdom.

Early life 

Berkeley was born in London to Humphry George Berkeley and Agnes Mary née Cheyne. He was educated privately and at Bedford Modern School. He later went to Fiji where his father was a prominent lawyer in Suva; then to Auckland, New Zealand, where he studied at Auckland University College and passed the Barristers Examination of the University of New Zealand. He was admitted to the Bar of Fiji and New Zealand in 1912, and to the Middle Temple (London) on 2 July 1919. He was a lieutenant in the 3rd (Auckland) Regiment of the territorials in New Zealand from 1911 to 1913.

Berkeley served in World War I as a captain in the Rifle Brigade. He was awarded the Military Cross in 1916. His citation reads:  Postwar he joined the staff of the League of Nations Union in 1919 as Editor of Pamphlets then Director of Propaganda, and the League Secretariat in 1921, resigning when he entered Parliament.

Politician 
He was elected as Member of Parliament (MP) for Nottingham Central at the 1922 general election, winning the seat with a majority of only 22 votes over the sitting Conservative MP Albert Atkey. He was re-elected in another two-way contest in 1923, but did not contest the 1924 general election. Labour fielded a candidate for the first time in Nottingham Central, and the Conservatives retook the seat.

He unsuccessfully contested the 1929 general election in Aberdeen North, and stood again in Nottingham Central at the by-election in 1930, where he won only 16.9% of the votes. He was defeated again in Aberdeen and Kincardine Central at the 1931 election. These defeats reflected the national decline in the fortunes of the Liberal Party and the rise of the Labour Party.

Writer 
His stage plays include The Lady with the Lamp (1929), based on the life of Florence Nightingale and starring Edith Evans in the title role, and The Man I Killed (1931), which was adapted for the screen as Broken Lullaby the following year. His play French Leave (1920) was filmed twice, once in 1930, and again in 1937. His screenwriting credits include Dreyfus (1931), Cavalcade (1933), The World Moves On (1934), Carolina (1934) and Nurse Edith Cavell (1939).

He died in 1935 in the Good Samaritan Hospital, Los Angeles aged 44 from pneumonia following a major operation. He was residing at 606 North Crescent Drive, Beverly Hills.

Personal life 
He had married Gwendoline Cock in 1914 and Clara Hildegarde Digby in 1926.

References

Further reading

External links 
 
 

1890 births
1935 deaths
British Army personnel of World War I
Liberal Party (UK) MPs for English constituencies
Rifle Brigade officers
UK MPs 1922–1923
UK MPs 1923–1924
Recipients of the Military Cross
English male screenwriters
Writers from London
People educated at Bedford Modern School
University of Auckland alumni
British male dramatists and playwrights
English male novelists
20th-century English novelists
20th-century English dramatists and playwrights
20th-century English male writers
20th-century English screenwriters